Richard Bunger Evans, also known as Richard Bunger, (born 1942) is an American composer and pianist who worked with John Cage and subsequently wrote "the classic book on John Cage," The Well-Prepared Piano. Evans has composed and performed music for opera and musical theatre, piano, art songs, prepared piano, choral music, string orchestra and chamber music. Evans continues to compose and perform in these various genres, and is highly respected as an accompanist to singers. During his 17-year career as a music professor, Evans was named one of two Outstanding Professors of 1981–1982 in the California State University system.

Early career
Evans was born in Allentown, Pennsylvania and, enrolling as Richard Bunger, studied at Lafayette College and Oberlin College where he obtained a B.Mus. in 1964. Evans continued at the University of Illinois and earned a master's degree in music in 1966. He studied further at the University of Kentucky. During his post-graduate studies, he taught at Queens University of Charlotte in North Carolina. One of his students in North Carolina was composer Betty Rose Wishart. In 1968 Evans accepted a position at Oberlin to teach music theory. A year later, Evans moved to Los Angeles, California to work as a jazz pianist. In 1970 he took a professorship at California State University, Dominguez Hills (CSUDH). Here he founded and directed the Electronic Music & Recording Program (EM&R), an interdisciplinary degree program between the departments of music, electronics, and media. As the first of its type on the West Coast, the program became a prototype for many such programs subsequently offered across the country. Evans was named Outstanding Professor 1981-1982 of the entire 23-campus California State University system.
Also at CSUDH, Evans wrote the music and helped write the lyric for the school's alma mater.

Prepared piano
While teaching at Queens College, Bunger became very interested in the techniques and performance of prepared piano, encountering John Cage in 1967. Evans studied Cage's early manuscripts and became expert enough that Cage asked him to edit some for publication, and to record performances of them. One such effort was a 1980 recording project at Capitol Records that eventually resulted in the Richard Bunger CD Four Walls, but it was not released to the public until after 1985 when Cage allowed it to be made available; Cage had long considered these expressive pieces unrepresentative of his most influential avant garde work. Evans wrote The Well-Prepared Piano in 1973, a treatise on piano techniques for new music composition and performance with illustrations drawn by the author. Cage wrote the foreword to the book, which has been repeatedly referred to by avant-garde pianists as a "classic" in the field. As well in 1973, Evans performed and recorded a concert of avant garde solo piano pieces at Oberlin, including works by Cage, Henri Lazarof, Barney Childs and Charles Ives. Using manuscript fragments and notes, Evans reconstructed Cage's 1939 incidental music for Jean Cocteau's Marriage At The Eiffel Tower. Evans toured extensively in the 1970s and early 1980s, exclusively performing music by 20th century American composers, from Charles Ives to Cage and beyond, always including lectures on the physical well-being of the piano in regard to challenging and potentially harmful avant garde performance techniques.

In 1973, Evans devised a way for pianists to hold their music while performing pieces that require the removal of the piano's traditional music stand. Evans called his invention the "Bungerack". Evans also invented a notational scheme called "Musiglyph", for unconventional piano compositions. Evans was invited to join Nicolas Slonimsky, Dane Rudhyar and others at the April 1973 music convocation called "The Expanded Ear", which culminated in the Six-Acre Jam, a piece in which 60 musicians played at various positions among the trees on a mountain slope. In May 1973, Evans performed live in the radio studio for Charles Amirkhanian's Other Minds radio program; Evans played compositions from Cage, Henry Cowell, Harold Budd, and E. T. Paull, and a recording of his piano and tape interpretation of a Morton Subotnick piece.

Concert pianist
Throughout the 1970s and early 1980s, Evans toured in North America and Europe in support of music by 20th century American composers. He recorded a complete album of prepared piano pieces Prepared Piano: The First 40 Years before 1983 when illness forced him to leave the field of music. In 1991, he returned to music, but in more traditional genres such as musical theatre, opera and oratorio rather than in avant garde styles.

Composer
From 1991, Evans concentrated on composing music in a wide variety of popular genres, especially art songs, choral music, opera, oratorio and musical theatre.

For the 1991 Grove Play entitled Tyburn Fair, Evans worked with a libretto from Bohemian Donald L. Winks to compose the oratorio, performed in July at the Bohemian Grove. Evans wrote the music for his next Grove Play in 2007 to a libretto by Mark Cleary: Leprechaun.

In May–June 1994, Evans was the musical director for A New York Romance, a one-woman performance piece set in New York City, sung and acted by Mary Setrakian. In 2000, Evans released the CD Midas & Marigold, A Family Opera, featuring music by Evans and book and lyrics by 'vid Buttaro and Squire Fridell.

In November 2004, Evans took part in a collaborative composition and performance work called "Raw Impressions Musical Theater #1", with eight other composers. In 1995 Evans composed and recorded the music for the two-hour opera an oratorio based on the poetic works of William Butler Yeats, Maude Gonne, and Padraic Pearse: The Rising, An Irish Allegory.

In 2001, Evans wrote the music for a performance of Thorstein Veblen's The Theory of the Leisure Class to a libretto by Charles Leipart, that was presented by the National Association of Musical Theatres in New York City in 2002 and recreated as a vaudeville production produced by Stages 2006, staged at Kansas City Ballet. This musical was rewritten by the authors, retitled as "The Price of Everything" and produced during 2010 by the 6th Street Playhouse in Santa Rosa, California, directed by Nancy Prebilich.

Evans’ other musicals as composer include The Playboy of Balyduff, An Irish Musical Comedy, with lyrics by Kate Hancock and book by Hancock and Evans, based on the 1907 Irish comedy by John Millington Synge; MIDLIFE! The Users’ Guide, a musical review with lyrics by Frank Evans and additional lyrics by R. Evans; and "The Golden Touch, A Family Musical," with book and lyrics by Maryrose Wood, commissioned by the International Institute of Vocal Arts and first produced in the Theatre at Riverside Church (NYC).

In 2009 Evans was commissioned by the West Bay Opera to create "Enchanted April, A Lyrical New Musical," based on the 1922 novel The Enchanted April by Elizabeth von Arnim. Evans in turn commissioned Charles Leipart to write the book and lyrics.  The initial Industry Presentations of Enchanted April, directed by Annette Jolles, were produced at the Chelsea Studios in NYC in March 2010, and starred Rebecca Luker, Jill Paice, Robert Petkoff, and George Dvorsky.

Family
Evans has three children from his second marriage: Berklee Sati (b. 1977) an employee of the non-profit NGO International Rivers and a lifelong dancer; Blake Lowrey-Evans (b. 1981), businessman, craft beer-maker, composer and jazz guitarist; and Beka Lowrey-Evans (b. 1984), a restaurant manager, singer and yoga practitioner.  He is married to Debra Wakefield Evans, a television editor.

References

External links
CSUDH Digital Collections. Photograph: Professor Bunger with students (early 1980s)
CSUDH Digital Collections. Photograph: Professor Bunger receiving award (June 12, 1982)
CSUDH Digital Collections. Photograph: Richard Bunger plays piano (early 1980s)
CSUDH Digital Collections. Photograph: Professor Bunger at the blackboard (1982)
CSUDH Digital Collections. Photograph: Professor Bunger, seated, in group accepting Japanese music (early 1980s)
CSUDH Digital Collections. Photograph: Bungerack - faculty invention (1973)

American male classical composers
Songwriters from Pennsylvania
1942 births
Living people
University of Kentucky alumni
University of Illinois alumni
Oberlin College alumni
Lafayette College alumni
Queens University of Charlotte faculty
20th-century classical composers
21st-century classical composers
21st-century American composers
American classical composers
Musicians from Allentown, Pennsylvania
20th-century American composers
Classical musicians from Pennsylvania
20th-century American male musicians
21st-century American male musicians
American male songwriters